Osvaldo Mendoza (born 23 March 1981) is a Paraguayan former football striker.

References

External links
 Mendoza looking for a spot in FAS squad 
 Estadística de goles en el CD FAS  

1981 births
Living people
Paraguayan footballers
Paraguayan expatriate footballers
Association football forwards
Club Tacuary footballers
C.D. FAS footballers
A.D. Isidro Metapán footballers
Expatriate footballers in Argentina
Expatriate footballers in El Salvador